The Teatro Donizetti is an opera house in Bergamo, Italy. Built in the 1780s using a design by architect Giovanni Francesco Lucchini, the theatre was originally referred to as either the Teatro Nuovo or Teatro di Fiera. The first opera to be mounted at the theatre, Giuseppe Sarti's Medonte, re di Epiro, was in 1784 while the opera house was still under construction. The official opening of the house, under the name the Teatro Riccardi, did not occur until 24 August 1791 with a production of Pietro Metastasio's Didone abbandonata set to music by multiple composers, including Ferdinando Bertoni, Giacomo Rampini, Johann Gottlieb Naumann, Giuseppe Gazzaniga, and Giovanni Paisiello.

In 1797 the original theatre was destroyed by a fire, possibly by arson. Lucchini was contracted again to design a new structure to replace the old one and the new house opened on 30 June 1800. The structure uses a horseshoe shape with three tiers of boxes and two galleries.

In 1897 the name of the theatre was changed to the Teatro Gaetano Donizetti (now shortened to Teatro Donizetti) on the occasion of the centenary of the composer's birth. Donizetti was born in Bergamo's Borgo Canale quarter and his first opera, Il Pigmalione (composed 1816), was given its world premiere at the theatre on 13 October 1960.

Adjacent to the theater is a park with the Monument to Donizetti.

External links

Opera houses in Italy
Music venues completed in 1800
Teatro Donizetti
Theatres in Lombardy
Teatro Donizetti
Theatres completed in 1791
Theatres completed in 1800
Music venues completed in 1791
Gaetano Donizetti
18th-century architecture in Italy